GNA may refer to:

People
 G.NA (born 1987), Canadian singer

Mythological
 Gná, a goddess in Norse mythology

Places
 Hrodna Airport (IATA airport code GNA), serving Grodna, Belarus
 Manuel Carlos Piar Guayana Airport (VORTAC: GNA; NDB: GNA),  Ciudad Guayana, Venezuela

Organizations
 Gna!, an association of software developers, and open source site
 Argentine National Gendarmerie
 Gambia National Army
 Ghana News Agency
 GNA University, in Phagwara, Punjab, India
 Government of National Accord, an interim government for Libya
 Army of the GNA, name given to the Turkish land forces during the Turkish War of Independence

Other uses
 Glycol nucleic acid
 Kaansa language (ISO 639-3 gna), a Gur language of Burkina Faso

See also
 GNAS (disambiguation)
 NA (disambiguation)
 KNA (disambiguation)
 Gina (disambiguation)
 Jina (disambiguation)
 JNA (disambiguation)